Patrick d'Assumçao (born 1 June 1959) is a French actor.

Theatre

Filmography

References

External links

 

1959 births
21st-century French male actors
French male film actors
French male stage actors
French male television actors
Living people
20th-century French male actors
Actors from Nantes